The 1896 Illinois gubernatorial election was held on November 3, 1896.

Incumbent Democratic Governor John Peter Altgeld was defeated by Republican nominee John Riley Tanner who won 54.10% of the vote.

Democratic nomination

Candidates
John Peter Altgeld, incumbent Governor

Results
The Democratic state convention was held on June 23, 1896, in Peoria.

Republican nomination

Candidates
Albert J. Hopkins, incumbent U.S. Congressman for Illinois's 8th congressional district
Dr. Joseph Robbins
John Riley Tanner, former Illinois State Treasurer, chairman of the Illinois State Republican Central Committee in 1894

Results
The Republican state convention was held on April 29 and 30, 1896 at Springfield.

General election

Candidates
John Peter Altgeld, Democratic
John Riley Tanner, Republican 
George Washington Gere, Prohibition
William St. John Forman, National Democrat, former U.S. Congressman for Illinois's 18th congressional district
Charles A. Baustian, Socialist Labor
Isaac W. Higgs, National

Results

References

Notes

Bibliography

Governor
1896
Illinois
November 1896 events